Foolscap or fool’s cap may refer to:
 Foolscap folio, a paper size of  ×  inches (216 × 343 mm)
 Foolscap, a paper size of 17 ×  inches (432 × 343 mm)
 Foolscap, a book by Michael Malone
 Fool’s cap, a cap with bells worn by court jesters

See also
 Cortinarius orellanus, also known as fool’s webcap, a poisonous mushroom